"The Crystal Snare" is a BBC Books adventure book written by Richard Dungworth and is based on the long-running British science fiction television series Doctor Who.
It features the Tenth Doctor and Martha.

This is part of the Decide Your Destiny series which makes you choose what happens in the books.

Reception
The book received some cautiously positive reviews, which also highlight that it is the range's first book not to be set in the future.

It was part of a second set of four books, which were successful enough to allow the range to continue.

References

2007 British novels
2007 science fiction novels
Decide Your Destiny gamebooks
Tenth Doctor novels